Cameraria affinis is a moth of the family Gracillariidae. It is known from Quebec, Canada, and the United States (including Connecticut, Texas, Utah and Kentucky).

The larvae feed on Lonicera species (including Lonicera × bella, Symphoricarpos species (including Symphoricarpos orbiculatus) and Triosteum angustifolium. They mine the leaves of their host plant. The mine has the form of a small blotch mine on the underside of the leaf.

References

Cameraria (moth)

Lepidoptera of Canada
Lepidoptera of the United States
Moths described in 1876
Leaf miners
Moths of North America
Taxa named by Heinrich Frey
Taxa named by Jacob Boll